In geometry, a centered trochoid is the roulette formed by a circle rolling along another circle. That is, it is the path traced by a point attached to a circle as the circle rolls without slipping along a fixed circle. The term encompasses both epitrochoid and hypotrochoid. The center of this curve is defined to be the center of the fixed circle.

Alternatively, a centered trochoid can be defined as the path traced by the sum of two vectors, each moving at a uniform speed in a circle. Specifically, a centered trochoid is a curve that can be parameterized in the complex plane by

 

or in the Cartesian plane by

 

where

 

If  is rational then the curve is closed and algebraic. Otherwise the curve winds around the origin an infinite number of times, and is dense in the annulus with outer radius  and inner radius .

Terminology
Most authors use epitrochoid to mean a roulette of a circle rolling around the outside of another circle, hypotrochoid to mean a roulette of a circle rolling around the inside of another circle, and trochoid to mean a roulette of a circle rolling along a line. However, some authors (for example  following F. Morley) use "trochoid" to mean a roulette of a circle rolling along another circle, though this is inconsistent with the more common terminology. The term Centered trochoid as adopted by  combines epitrochoid and hypotrochoid into a single concept to streamline mathematical exposition and remains consistent  with the existing standard. 

The term Trochoidal curve describes epitrochoids, hypotrochoids, and trochoids (see ). A trochoidal curve can be defined as the path traced by the sum of two vectors, each moving at a uniform speed in a circle or in a straight line (but not both moving in a line). 

In the parametric equations given above, the curve is an epitrochoid if  and  have the same sign, and a hypotrochoid if they have opposite signs.

Dual generation
Let a circle of radius  be rolled on a circle of radius , and a point  is attached to the rolling circle. In either case we may use  where . Then, applying the formula for the  roulette, the point traces out a curve given by:

This is the parameterization given above with 

 can be reparameterized as
 and the equations 

The curve  remains the same if the indexes 
This produces the Dual generation theorem which states that, with the exception of the special case discussed below, any centered trochoid can be generated in two essentially different ways as the roulette of a circle rolling on another circle.

Examples

Cardioid
Take  to get . The circles both have radius 1 and, since c < 0, the rolling circle is rolling around the outside of the fixed circle. The point p is 1 unit from the center of the rolling so it lies on its circumference. This is the usual definition of the cardioid.
 
to get 
 In this case the fixed circle has radius 1, the rolling circle has radius 2, and, since c > 0, the rolling circle revolves around the fixed circle in the fashion of a hula hoop. This produces an essentially different definition of the same curve.

Ellipse
If  then we obtain the parametric curve , or 
. This gives two different ways of generating an ellipse, both of which involve a circle rolling inside a circle with twice the diameter.

Straight line
In this case the curve is simply  or a segment of the x-axis.

The circle is symmetric about the origin, so both of these give the same pair of circles. In this case the curve is simply : a segment of the y-axis.

So the case  is an exception (in fact the only exception) to the dual generation theorem stated above. This degenerate case, in which the curve is a straight-line segment, underlies the Tusi-couple.

References
 "Centered trochoid" on mathcurve.com
 "Epitrochoid" on mathcurve.com
 "Hypotrochoid" on mathcurve.com
 "Peritrochoid" on mathcurve.com
 Yates, R. C.: A Handbook on Curves and Their Properties, J. W. Edwards (1952), "Trochoids" 
 Trochoids: Curves Generated by a Rolling Circle

External links
 Introduction and Flash Animation of Epitrochoid (Spanish)
 Introduction and Flash Animation of Hypotrochoid (Spanish)
 Flash Animation of Epitrochoid
 Flash Animation of Hypotrochoid
 Epitrochoid at Mathworld
 Hypotrochoid at Mathworld
 Visual Dictionary of Special Plane Curves 
 Visual Dictionary of Special Plane Curves
 "Trochoid" at Springer Online Encyclopaedia of Mathematics

Roulettes (curve)